West Clifton Forge was an incorporated town located in Alleghany County, Virginia, United States. In 1906 the towns of Clifton Forge and West Clifton Forge merged to form the independent city of Clifton Forge.

Geography of Alleghany County, Virginia
Former municipalities in Virginia